A social butterfly is a slang term for a person who is socially dynamic, successful at networking, charismatic, and personally gregarious.
It may also refer to:
 Social Butterfly, a character in the comic book series Livewires
 "Social Butterfly", a song recorded by Finnish singer Kim Herold

Slang